This is a list of Danish television related events from 1962.

Events
11 February - Ellen Winther is selected to represent Denmark at the 1962 Eurovision Song Contest with her song "Vuggevise". She is selected to be the sixth Danish Eurovision entry during Dansk Melodi Grand Prix held at the Tivolis Koncertsal in Copenhagen.

Debuts

Television shows

Ending this year

Births
1 November - Hella Joof, actress, comedian & director

Deaths

See also
 1962 in Denmark